Duckenfield is a locality in the City of Maitland, New South Wales, Australia. It lies on the south bank of the Hunter River. The first European settler in the locality was John Eales who had two estates Berry Park and Duckenfield House both along Duckenfield Road. The area is known from breeding race horses.

Duckenfield 
John Eales was granted 2100 acres on the Hunter River and was assigned six convicts. It was built out of Sydney sandstone with a plain verandah. In 1822, Eales purchased a property from Dr Moran. The property had 45 room and was two stories  In 1870s, John Eales junior completed some extensions. The property was sold to BHP in 1916, which they demolished the property for building material in 1917.

Duckenfield Park Creamery and Butter Factory 
In 1895 John Eales decided to  establish a creamery and butter factory. In 1897 the factory won first prize for butter at Royal Agricultural Show . In 1898 the factory started to exported to England and other countries .On the 1st of  January 1902  became a cooperative  under the management of William McMillian. In 1906 the factory moved to Morpeth. Eighteen months later the company was factory facing bankruptcy  was purchased by

Bowthrone Butter Factory for £410

References 

Geography of New South Wales
Australia articles needing attention